1-Androsterone (also known as 1-andro, 1-dehydroepiandrosterone, 1-DHEA, δ1-epiandrosterone, or 5α-androst-1-en-3β-ol-17-one) is a synthetic, orally active anabolic-androgenic steroid (AAS). It is an androgen prohormone of 1-testosterone (dihydroboldenone), 1-androstenedione, and other 1-dehydrogenated androstanes. The drug has been sold on the Internet as a designer steroid and "dietary supplement". It is a positional isomer of dehydroepiandrosterone (DHEA; 5-dehydroepiandrosterone).

See also
 4-Dehydroepiandrosterone
 Androsterone
 Epiandrosterone

References

Sterols
Androgens and anabolic steroids
Androstanes
Ketones
Prodrugs